This page documents all the tornadoes that touched down in the United States in April 2007. Tornadoes in the month of January are given with their Fujita Scale intensity while all tornadoes from February and on are given with their Enhanced Fujita Scale intensity. This is because the scale was changed on February 1 due to the National Weather Service implementing a more accurate way to classify tornadoes.

United States Yearly Total

Note: January tornadoes were rated using the old Fujita scale, but are included in the chart above by matching the F rating to the related EF scale rating.

April
There were 187 tornadoes were reported in the US in April, of which 167 were confirmed.

April 3 event

April 10 event

April 11 event

April 13 event

April 14 event

April 15 event

April 17 event

April 20 event

April 21 event

April 22 event

April 23 event

April 24 event

April 25 event

April 26 event

April 27 event

April 29 event

April 30 event

See also
 Tornadoes of 2007
 List of United States tornadoes in March 2007
 List of United States tornadoes in May 2007

Notes

References

F4 tornadoes
Tornadoes of 2007
2007 natural disasters in the United States
2007